Snooker world rankings 1997/1998: The professional world rankings for the top 64 snooker players in the 1997–98 season are listed below.

References

1997
Rankings 1998
Rankings 1997